Giovanni Antonelli (1 October 1818 – 14 January 1872) was an Italian scientist, astronomer and engineer.

Antonelli was born in Pistoia, Tuscany. A Catholic priest, he was director of the Ximenian Observatory of Florence from 1851 until his death.

In 1858 he installed a lightning rod designed by himself and Filippo Cecchi on the Florence cathedral. Again with Father Cecchi, he collaborated in the design of a prototype of internal combustion engine with Eugenio Barsanti and Felice Matteucci. Father Antonelli wrote numerous treatises, concerning various arguments from astronomy to mathematics, hydraulics and others; he also published a comment to astronomical passages in the Divine Comedy.

Works

See also
List of Roman Catholic scientist-clerics

References

Further reading

External links
 

1818 births
1872 deaths
People from Pistoia
19th-century Italian astronomers
19th-century Italian mathematicians
Engineers from Florence
Italian science writers
Italian technology writers
Catholic clergy scientists